The Roman Catholic Diocese of Hamilton may refer to:

 The Roman Catholic Diocese of Hamilton, Ontario, Canada
 The Roman Catholic Diocese of Hamilton in Bermuda
 The Roman Catholic Diocese of Hamilton, New Zealand